Kimmy Dora: Ang Kiyemeng Prequel is a 2013 Filipino action comedy film directed by Chris Martinez, starring Eugene Domingo and Sam Milby. It is the prequel and the third installment of the original Kimmy Dora film series. The film is one of the official entries of the 2013 Metro Manila Film Festival that will be distributed by Spring Films with co-production of MJM Productions and Quantum Films that was released in theaters last Christmas Day (December 25, 2013).

The film is set before the events of Kimmy Dora: Kambal sa Kiyeme wherein the twins are seen disputing the ownership of the family corporation.

The film was inspired by the James Bond film series in terms of musical score and visual effects.

Piolo Pascual was reportedly the leading man of Domingo in the film but was replaced by Sam Milby due to busy schedule.

Plot
Kimmy (Eugene Domingo), graduates summa cum laude from a posh school abroad. She expects to take over her family's business empire, but is disappointed when she's asked to start working at the bottom of the company first.

Kimmy must also compete with Dora (Eugene Domingo), who just wants to jumpstart her budding acting career. Dora might not want to work for the family business, yet she plays along because she has a major crush on their internship supervisor Rodin (Sam Milby).

While all these are happening, a mysterious entity named Bogart is out to sabotage their business empire. Will Kimmy and Dora be able to save the company from Bogart? Who gets to head the family business? Who will win Rodin's affections?

Cast

Main Cast
Eugene Domingo as Kimmy/Dora GoDongHae
Sam Milby as Rodin Bartoletti

Supporting cast
Ariel Ureta as Luisito GoDongHae
Miriam Quiambao as Gertrude
Moi Bien as Elena
Mura as Lolo/Herbal Doctor
Joel Torre as Curtis
Angel Aquino as Bridget/Bogart

Cameo
Paulo Avelino as Elevator passenger
Sam Concepcion as Hae Hae Restaurant customer
Tippy Dos Santos as Hae Hae Restaurant customer
Mylene Dizon as Parking customer
Zanjoe Marudo as Barry
Dingdong Dantes as Johnson
Piolo Pascual as Buko Vendor
Cai Cortez as Shop customer
Tess Antonio as Employee
John Lapus as Poor/Beggar

Extras
Marc Conrad Vito as Shop customer kid
Jean Weigmann as Shop customer 
Rhae Lermadosa as Guest

References

External links

2013 films
2013 action comedy films
Tagalog-language films
Philippine action comedy films
Spring Films films
2013 comedy films
2010s films
Films directed by Chris Martinez